All Saints Church is in the village of Orton, Cumbria, England. It is an active Anglican parish church in the deanery of Appleby, the archdeaconry of Carlisle, and the diocese of Carlisle. Its benefice is united with those of St Oswald, Revenstonedale, and St James, Tebay. The church is recorded in the National Heritage List for England as a designated Grade II* listed building.

History

The earliest fabric in the church dates from the later part of the 12th century. The tower was built in the early 16th century, and the porch is dated 1607. In 1877–78, the chancel and north aisle were rebuilt by the Lancaster architects Paley and Austin. In 2006–07, the tower was rendered in lime, giving it a white appearance.

Architecture

The church is constructed in stone, with roofs of either lead or slate. Its plan consists of a three-bay nave, north and south aisles, a south porch, an aisleless chancel, and a west tower. The south aisle is wider than the north. The tower is in three stages and has a castellated parapet. The windows along the aisles have three lights, and the chancel contains lancet windows.

Inside the church is an octagonal stone font dated 1662, inscribed with the initials "DW" and "MO". At the east end of the south aisle is a piscina in a trefoil-arched recess. Over the entrance to the church is a panel painted with Royal arms dated 1695. The pulpit is Victorian and consists of an octagonal bowl on a stone base. The stained glass in the east window is by Clayton and Bell, and in the south wall of the chancel the glass is by Abbot and Company, dated 1897. In the south aisle is a window designed by Beatrice Whistler (the wife of James McNeill Whistler), made by Campbell, Smith and Company in 1892; one designed by F. G. Christmas and made by the same company in about the same date; and another by Stanley Murray Scott for Reed Millican, dated 1959. There are memorials in the church dating from the 18th and 19th centuries.

The two-manual organ was made in about 1878 by Wilkinson and Son, and was overhauled in 1995 by Harrison and Harrison. There is a ring of eight bells. The oldest of these was cast by Abraham Rudhall I in 1711. The other seven were cast in 1917 by John Taylor & Co. There are three other bells that are unused. One of these was cast in about 1529 by John Woolley, and the other two in 1637, possibly by William Oldfield I.

See also

Grade II* listed buildings in Eden District
Listed buildings in Orton, Eden
List of ecclesiastical works by Paley and Austin

References

External links
 Visit Cumbria: includes photographs

English Gothic architecture in Cumbria
Gothic Revival architecture in Cumbria
Church of England church buildings in Cumbria
Grade II* listed churches in Cumbria
Diocese of Carlisle
Paley and Austin buildings
All Saints Church